Laodice of Macedonia was a Greek noblewoman and wife of Antiochus (fl. 4th century BC), a general of distinction in the service of Philip II of Macedon. She was the mother of Seleucus, the founder of the Seleucid Empire and Seleucus' sister Didymeia. It was pretended, in consequence of a dream which she had, that Apollo was the real father of her child. No less than five cities were founded by Seleucus in different parts of his dominions, which bore in her honour the name of Laodicea.

References
Smith, William; Dictionary of Greek and Roman Biography and Mythology, "Laodice (4)", Boston, (1867)

Notes

 

4th-century BC Greek people
4th-century BC Greek women
Seleucid dynasty